Sounga may refer to:

Sounga, Gabon, a town in south-east Gabon
List of InuYasha special items and attacks